This is a list of 19th-century British children's literature illustrators (ordered by year of birth):

 George Cruikshank (1792–1878)
 Edward Lear (1812–1888)
 John Tenniel (1820–1914) 
 Thomas Dalziel (1823–1906)
 Richard Doyle (1824–1883)
 Eleanor Vere Boyle (1825–1916)
 Sydney Prior Hall (1842–1922)
 Thomas Crane (1843–1903)
 Walter Crane (1845–1915)
 Kate Greenaway (1846–1901)
 Randolph Caldecott (1846–1886)
 John George Sowerby (1850–1914)
 Gordon Browne (1858–1932)
 Beatrix Potter (1866–1943)
 Arthur Rackham (1867–1939)
 H. R. Millar (1869–1940)
 John Hancock (1896–1918)

 Illustrators
children's literature illustrators 19th-century
Lists of 19th-century people